Carneades grandis is a species of beetle in the family Cerambycidae. It was described by Thomson in 1860. It is known from Belize, Honduras, and Mexico.

References

Colobotheini
Beetles described in 1860